The coinage metals comprise, at a minimum, those metallic chemical elements which have historically been used as components in alloys used to mint coins. The term is not perfectly defined, however, since a number of metals have been used to make "demonstration coins" which have never been used to make monetized coins for any nation-state, but could be. Some of these elements would make excellent coins in theory (for example, zirconium), but their status as coin metals is not clear. In general, because of problems caused when coin metals are intrinsically valuable as commodities, there has been a trend in the 21st century toward use of coinage metals of only the least exotic and expensive types.

History
Historically, most coinage metals (or alloys) are from the three nonradioactive members of group 11 of the periodic table: copper, silver and gold, the copper usually being augmented with tin and often other metals to form bronze. Gold, silver and bronze or copper were the coinage metals of the ancient world, and most medieval coins.

All western histories of coins begin invention at some time slightly before or after 700 BC, in Aegina Island, or, according to others, in Ephesus, Lydia, 650 BC. Ancient India in circa 6th century BC, was one of the earliest issuers of coins in the world.

Since that time, coins have been the most universal embodiment of money. These first coins were made of electrum, a naturally occurring pale yellow mixture of gold and silver that was further alloyed with silver and copper.

However, the Persian daric was the first gold coin which, along with a similar silver coin, the siglos, (From Ancient Greek σίγλος, Hebrew שֶׁקֶל (shékel)) represented the bimetallic monetary standard of the Achaemenid Persian Empire which has continued till today. The Persian coins were also very well known in the Persian and Sassanids era. Most notably, in Susa and in Ctesiphon.

However, there are many more, even for coins made from intrinsically precious metals. Precious metals are always used in bullion coins and some collectable coins. Coins not intended for circulation or for intrinsic value have also been made experimentally using an even larger variety of metals, since they function as fiat money. In general coins intended for circulation must have metal values considerably less than their face values, for reasons discussed below.

Requirements for a coinage metal
Coins that are intended for circulation have some special requirements based on the conditions they will encounter. For example, a coin may be in circulation for up to 30 years, and so must have excellent wear resistance and anti-corrosion properties. Achieving this goal necessitates the use of base metal alloys. Some metals like manganese have occasionally been used in coins, but suffer from making the coins too hard to take an impression well (or metals apt to wear out stamping machines at the mint).

When minting coins, especially low denomination coins, there is a risk that the value of metal within a coin is greater than the face value. This leads to the possibility of smelters taking coins and melting them down for the scrap value of the metal. Pre-1992 British pennies were made of 97% copper; but as of 2008, based on the price of copper, the value of a penny from this period is 1.5 new-pence. Modern British pennies are now made of copper-plated steel. For similar reasons, American pennies (cents) were once made of copper alloys, but since 1982 have been made of copper-plated zinc.

This problem has led to nearly the end of use for a common base metal alloy for everyday coinage in the 20th century, called cupronickel, with varying proportions of copper and nickel, most commonly 75% Cu 25% Ni. Cupronickel has a silver color, is hard wearing and has excellent striking properties, essential for the design of the coin to be pressed accurately and quickly during manufacture. In the 21st century with the prices of both copper and nickel rising, it has become more common to experiment with various alloys of steel, often stainless steel. For example, in India some coins have been made from a stainless steel that contains 82% iron, 18% chromium, and many other countries that have minted coins that contain metals now worth nearly the coin face-value, are experimenting with various steel alloys.

Chemical elements used in circulating coins

Non-circulating
Chemical elements used in non-circulating (commemorative, demo, bullion or novelty) coins, medals, patterns, and trial strikes:

Cadmium (1828 medal made by G. Loos for the marriage of Heinrich von Dechen, "of Silesian cadmium")
Cobalt (2005 Cameroon 750 CFA francs struck in cobalt-plated iron.)
Hafnium (Fred Zinkann demo coin.)
Iridium (2013  oz 10 franc bullion coin issued by Rwanda as part of "Noble Five" precious metals set.)
Molybdenum (Demo coinFred Zinkann) (Mintage 250-1 tr oz coins 2008 by Coins By DesignMurray Buckner.)
Niobium (Austria has issued a number of bimetallic 25 euro coins with a niobium center.)
Palladium (First issued 1966 by Sierra Leone. Also presentation sets from Tonga, bullion coins of various countries.)
Rhenium (Fred Zinkann fantasy piecesPope Matthew Triple Ducat and Malvinas 5 Australes)
Rhodium (2014  oz 10 franc bullion coin issued by Rwanda as part of "Noble Six" precious metals set. Also Cohen Mint bullion round.)
Ruthenium (1967  Hau from Tonga was 98% palladium and 2% ruthenium)
Selenium (1862 medal in UK Science Museum, commemorating Berzelius, discoverer of the element.)
Silicon (Privately struck US quarter patterns dated 1964 (Pollock-5380) in nickel-silicon alloy.) 
Tantalum (Used in a bimetallic silver-tantalum coin from Kazakhstan.)
Tellurium (1896 Hungarian mining medal. Reproductions exist from 1975.)
Titanium (First issued 1999 by Gibraltar. Austria has made bimetallic silver/titanium commemoratives.)
Tungsten (Alloys are too hard. A few private demos struck only for experimentation. Fred Zinkann US half eagle patterns.)
Uranium (Two types of a German medal of native uranium.)
Vanadium (Mintage 20-1 Troy ounce coins 2011 by Coins By DesignMurray Buckner.)
Zirconium (Mintage 500-1 Troy ounce coins 2012 including 50 black & 50 Rainbow by Coins By DesignMurray Buckner.)

Element Series
Beginning in 2006, Dave Hamric (Metallium) has been attempting to strike "coins" (technically tokens or medals, about the size of a US cent) of every stable chemical element. To date he has struck tokens of the following elements, apparently not only metals:

Aluminium
Antimony
Barium (reactive, sealed in glass capsule)
Beryllium
Bismuth
Boron (mixed with binder, sealed in resin cast)
Cadmium
Calcium (reactive, sealed in glass capsule)
Carbon (mixed with binder, sealed in resin cast)
Cerium (reactive, sealed in glass capsule)
Chromium
Cobalt
Copper
Dysprosium
Erbium
Europium (reactive, sealed in glass capsule)
Gadolinium
Gallium
Gold
Hafnium
Holmium
Indium
Iridium
Iron
Lanthanum (reactive, sealed in glass capsule)
Lead
Lutetium
Magnesium
Mercury (sealed in resin cast)
Molybdenum
Neodymium (reactive, sealed in glass capsule)
Nickel
Niobium
Palladium
Phosphorus (mixed with binder, sealed in resin cast)
Platinum
Praseodymium (reactive, sealed in glass capsule)
Rhenium
Rhodium
Ruthenium
Samarium (reactive, sealed in glass capsule)
Scandium
Selenium
Silver
Strontium (reactive, sealed in glass capsule)
Sulfur
Tantalum
Tellurium
Terbium
Thallium (extremely poisonous. Lead token clad on one side with thallium foil and sealed in resin.)
Thulium
Tin
Titanium
Uranium (not offered for sale)
Vanadium
Ytterbium
Yttrium
Zinc
Zirconium

Article "World's Coinage Uses 24 Chemical Elements"
World Coin News magazine published an article titled "World's Coinage Uses 24 Chemical Elements" by Jay and Marieli Roe, which appeared in two consecutive issues: Feb. 17, 1992, pages 24–25; and Mar. 2, 1992, pages 18–19.

The article was based on an award-winning exhibit that was assembled by Jay and Marieli Roe (a.k.a. Dr. John Westel Rowe, an organic chemist in Wisconsin, and his wife Marieli Rowe), and shown during the 1987–1990 period. The 24 elements named are: Al, Sb, C, Co, Cu, Au, Hf, Fe, Pb, Mg, Mo, Ni, Nb, Pd, Pt, Re, Ag, Ta, Sn, Ti, W, V, Zn and Zr.

The ANA did not award Best-of-Show "because the exhibit was downgraded for incompleteness" due to two missing pieces. However, the author defended his choices: The British Royal Mint's rhodium token "is only rhodium-plated", and the Pobjoy Mint's iridium coin "does not exist (possible confusion with palladium?)."

Curiously, chromium and manganese were not mentioned, even though both elements had been used in common circulation coins (Canada wartime V nickels and US wartime Jefferson nickels, respectively) long before the time of the article's publication.

Non-metallic materials used for circulating coins

References

External links
 Comprehensive list of metals and their alloys which have been used at various times, in coins for all types of purposes.
  Site of coinage metals and alloys